Yoritsune is a masculine Japanese given name.

Possible writings
Yoritsune can be written using many different combinations of kanji characters. Here are some examples:

頼常, "rely, usual"
頼恒, "rely, always"
頼毎, "rely, every"
依常, "to depend on, usual"
依恒, "to depend on, always"
依毎, "to depend on, every"

The name can also be written in hiragana よりつね or katakana ヨリツネ.

Notable people with the name
 (1218–1256), Japanese shōgun
 (1907–2001), Japanese classical composer

Japanese masculine given names